Coptops leucostictica is a species of beetle in the family Cerambycidae. It was described by White in 1858. It is known from India, Cambodia, Thailand, Laos, China, Myanmar, Malaysia, and Vietnam. It feeds on Albizia julibrissin.

Subspecies
 Coptops leucostictica leucostictica White, 1858
 Coptops leucostictica rustica Gressitt, 1940

References

leucostictica
Beetles described in 1858